Heads Up! is an album by American trumpeter Blue Mitchell recorded in 1967 and released on the Blue Note label.

Reception

The Allmusic review awarded the album 3 stars.

Track listing

 "Heads Up! Feet Down!" (Jimmy Heath) - 5:59
 "Togetherness" (Jimmy Heath) - 6:48
 "The Folks Who Live On the Hill" (Jerome Kern, Oscar Hammerstein II) - 5:32
 "Good Humour Man" (Don Pickett) - 5:39
 "Len Sirrah" (Melba Liston) - 7:19
 "The People in Nassau" (Blue Mitchell) - 5:40

Personnel
Blue Mitchell, Burt Collins - trumpet
Jerry Dodgion - flute, alto saxophone
Junior Cook - tenor saxophone
Pepper Adams - baritone saxophone
Julian Priester - trombone
McCoy Tyner - piano
Gene Taylor - bass
Al Foster - drums
Jimmy Heath (1-2), Melba Liston (5), Duke Pearson (4, 6), Don Pickett (4) - arrangement

References

Blue Note Records albums
Blue Mitchell albums
1968 albums
Albums recorded at Van Gelder Studio
Albums produced by Alfred Lion
Albums arranged by Jimmy Heath
Albums arranged by Melba Liston
Albums arranged by Duke Pearson